The Secretary to the State Government (SSG) is an official in the state governments of Nigeria's 36 states. The individual who holds the office is usually appointed by the State Governor.

Role 
The Secretary to the State Government is a high-ranking appointed executive branch official whose main responsibility is to assist the government achieve its vision and objectives through the provision of advice and guidance. In addition, the Secretary to the State Government handles policy-making and oversees the implementation of decisions, policies and programmes as well as the operations of government ministries, agencies and parastatals. 

The Secretary to the State Government is in charge of its subsidiaries including the State Executive Council Secretariat, the General Administration Office, the State Directorate of Volunteer Services (DVS), the Speech Writing Unit and the state office of the New Partnership for Africa's Development (NEPAD).

Current SSGs

References

 
State government in Nigeria
Lists of current office-holders